Phaeax was a celebrated architect of Akragas, who flourished about 480 BC, and executed several important public works for his native city. Among the most remarkable of these works were the sewers, which were named after the architect.

References

Ancient Greek architects
Ancient Acragantines
5th-century BC Greek people